"Hey My Friend" is Tomoko Kawase's second single under Tommy Heavenly6, and the eight overall single from her solo career. Hey My Friend and Roller Coaster Ride were both themes for the movie Shimotsuma Monogatari. The song peaked at #20 in Japan and stayed on the charts for 9 weeks. The Hey My Friend single sold a total of 39,000 units.

Track listing
Hey My Friend
Roller Coaster Ride
Hey My Friend (Original Instrumental)

References

2004 singles
Tomoko Kawase songs
2004 songs
Defstar Records singles
Japanese film songs
Songs written by Shunsaku Okuda